Ada Buch Polak (19 September 1914 – 25 October 2010) was a Norwegian art historian.

Biography
Andrea Buch was born in Ljan, Norway. Her father was the engineer Harald Buch (1872–1950) and her mother was the teacher Camilla Collett (1878–1973). She was a great-granddaughter of writer Camilla Collett  (1813–1895) and professor  Peter Jonas Collett  (1813-1851),  grandniece of museum curator Robert (1842-1913) and historian Alf Collett (1844–1919). Her sister Ellisiv (1908–2001) married  historian and professor Sverre Steen (1898–1983).

She finished her secondary education in 1933 and graduated from the University of Oslo in 1940 with the thesis Norsk Glass 1739–1753, and continued working with glass to take her doctorate in 1953 on the thesis Gammelt norsk glass.

She spent half a year as an associate professor at the Norwegian Museum of Decorative Arts and Design, and was then a curator at West Norway Museum of Decorative Art  (Vestlandske Kunstindustrimuseum) from 1942 to 1948. 

Polak spent the rest of her career as a freelance writer, in books, journals and yearbooks, magazines and newspapers. She was on a state scholarship from the early 1980s. She was a member of the Norwegian Academy of Science and Letters, and was decorated as a Knight, First Class of the Royal Norwegian Order of St. Olav in 1981.

Personal life
In July 1948 she married British solicitor Alfred Laurence Polak (1900–1992), and moved to London. She died in October 2010 in London.

References

1914 births
2010 deaths
Writers from Oslo
University of Oslo alumni
Norwegian art historians
Norwegian curators
Norwegian expatriates in the United Kingdom
Members of the Norwegian Academy of Science and Letters
Norwegian women historians
Women art historians
Order of Saint Olav
Norwegian women curators